Numberphile is an educational YouTube channel featuring videos that explore topics from a variety of fields of mathematics. In the early days of the channel, each video focused on a specific number, but the channel has since expanded its scope, featuring videos on more advanced mathematical concepts such as Fermat's Last Theorem, the Riemann hypothesis and Kruskal's tree theorem. The videos are produced by Brady Haran, a former BBC video journalist and creator of Periodic Videos, Sixty Symbols, and several other YouTube channels. Videos on the channel feature several university professors, maths communicators and famous mathematicians.

In 2018, Haran released a spin-off audio podcast titled The Numberphile Podcast.

YouTube channel
The Numberphile YouTube channel was started on 15 September 2011. Most videos consist of Haran interviewing an expert on a number, mathematical theorem or other mathematical concept. The expert usually draws out their explanation on a large piece of brown paper and attempts to make the concepts understandable to the average, non-mathematician viewer. It is supported by the Mathematical Sciences Research Institute (MSRI) and Math for America. Haran also runs the "Numberphile2" channel, which includes extra footage and further detail than the main channel.

The channel was nominated for a Shorty Award in Education in 2016. The New York Times has said, 'At Numberphile, mathematicians discourse, enthusiastically and winningly, on numbers'.

Contributors
The channel has featured mathematicians, computer scientists, scientists and science writers, including:

 Federico Ardila
 Johnny Ball
 Alex Bellos
 Elwyn Berlekamp
 Andrew Booker
 Steven Bradlow
 Timothy Browning
 Brian Butterworth
 John Conway
 Ed Copeland
 Tom Crawford 
 Zsuzsanna Dancso
 Persi Diaconis
 Marcus Du Sautoy
 Rob Eastaway
 Laurence Eaves
 David Eisenbud
 Edward Frenkel
 Hannah Fry
 Lisa Goldberg
 James Grime 
 Ron Graham
 Edmund Harriss
 Gordon Hamilton
 Tim Harford
 Don Knuth
 Holly Krieger
 James Maynard
 Barry Mazur
 Steve Mould
 Colm Mulcahy
 Tony Padilla
 Simon Pampena
 Matt Parker
 Roger Penrose
 Carl Pomerance
 Ken Ribet
 Tom Scott
 Henry Segerman
 Carlo H. Séquin
 Jim Simons
 Simon Singh
 Neil Sloane
 Ben Sparks
 Katie Steckles
 Zvezdelina Stankova
 Clifford Stoll
 Terence Tao
 Tadashi Tokieda
 Mariel Vázquez
 Cédric Villani
 Zandra Vinegar

The Numberphile Podcast

Haran started a podcast titled The Numberphile Podcast in 2018 as a sister project. The podcast more heavily focuses on the lives and personalities of some of the subjects of the videos.

References

External links 
 

2018 podcast debuts
Science podcasts
Recreational mathematics
Mathematics education
YouTube channels launched in 2011
Education-related YouTube channels